Emilianowo may refer to the following places:
Emilianowo, Greater Poland Voivodeship (west-central Poland)
Emilianowo, Kuyavian-Pomeranian Voivodeship (north-central Poland)
Emilianowo, Gmina Iława in Warmian-Masurian Voivodeship (north Poland)
Emilianowo, Gmina Susz in Warmian-Masurian Voivodeship (north Poland)
Emilianowo, West Pomeranian Voivodeship (north-west Poland)